The Art Ensemble of Chicago is an avant-garde jazz group that grew out of the Association for the Advancement of Creative Musicians (AACM) in the late 1960s. The ensemble integrates many jazz styles and plays many instruments, including "little instruments": bells, bicycle horns, birthday party noisemakers, wind chimes, and various forms of percussion. The musicians would wear costumes and face paint while performing. These characteristics combined to make the ensemble's performances both aural and visual. While playing in Europe in 1969, five hundred instruments were used.

History

Members of what was to become the Art Ensemble performed together under various band names in the mid-sixties, as members of the Association for the Advancement of Creative Musicians (AACM). They performed on the 1966 album Sound, as the Roscoe Mitchell Sextet. The Sextet included saxophonist Roscoe Mitchell, trumpeter Lester Bowie, and bassist Malachi Favors. For the next year, they played as the Roscoe Mitchell Art Ensemble. In 1967, they were joined by fellow AACM members Joseph Jarman (saxophone) and Phillip Wilson (drums) and recorded for Nessa Records.

All of the musicians were multi-instrumentalists. Jarman and Mitchell's primary instruments were alto and tenor saxophone, respectively, but they played other saxophones (from the small sopranino to the large bass saxophone), and the flute and clarinet. In addition to trumpet, Bowie played flugelhorn, cornet, shofar, and conch shells. Favors added touches of banjo and bass guitar. Most of them dabbled in piano, synthesizer, and other keyboards, and they all played percussion instruments.

They were known for wearing costumes and makeup on stage. Member Joseph Jarman  described part of their style: 

In 1967, Wilson left the group to join Paul Butterfield's band, and for a period the group was a quartet without a full-time drummer. Jarman and Mitchell served as artistic directors at the cooperative summer camp Circle Pines Center in Delton, Michigan, in August of 1968, during the same week that the Democratic Convention was in Chicago.  After a farewell concert at the Unitarian Church in Evanston, Illinois, in fall, 1968, the remaining group traveled to Paris. In Paris, the ensemble was based at the Théâtre des Vieux Colombier.
 In France, they became known as the Art Ensemble of Chicago. The impetus for the name change came from a French promoter who added "of Chicago" to their name for descriptive purposes, but the new name stuck because band members felt that it better reflected the cooperative nature of the group. In Paris, the ensemble was based at the Théâtre des Vieux Colombier  and they recorded for the Freedom and BYG labels. They also recorded Comme à la radio with Brigitte Fontaine and Areski Belkacem but without a drummer until percussionist Don Moye became a member of the group in 1970. During that year, they recorded the albums Art Ensemble of Chicago with Fontella Bass and Les Stances a Sophie with singer Fontella Bass, who was Lester Bowie's wife. The latter was the soundtrack from the French movie of the same title.

Fifty years on
Lester Bowie died of liver cancer in 1999. Malachi Favors died in 2004 of pancreatic cancer. Joseph Jarman died on January 9, 2019, of respiratory failure.

As of 2017-2019 Mitchell and Moye remained active, with new and previous collaborators as guest under the name Art Ensemble of Chicago - 50th Anniversary Large Ensemble. They released an album in 2019:
 Roscoe Mitchell – saxophones;
 Famoudou Don Moye – drums, congas and percussion.
Guests:
  - african drums and djembe
  - trumpet, flugelhorn
 – double bass
  – piano
 Jean Cook – violin
  - conductor
  – voice
  – African percussion
  – viola
  - trombone
 Nicole Mitchell – flutes
 Moor Mother – spoken word
  - soprano vocals
  – double bass and objects
 Hugh Ragin – trumpet, flugelhorn and piccolo trumpet
 Tomeka Reid – cello
  - conductor
 Jaribu Shahid – double bass
  - cello
  – trombone
 Baba Sissoko – African percussion
  - vocals, congas, mbira, bells
  – voice, array mbira, autoharp, q-chord, theremin, sampler, electronics
  - congas, djembe and percussion

and another in 2023 with a smaller ensemble of 20 musicians - The Sixth Decade: From Paris to Paris.

Discography

Further reading
 Steinbeck, Paul.  Message to Our Folks: The Art Ensemble of Chicago. University of Chicago Press, 2017.
 Lewis, George E. A Power Stronger Than Itself: The AACM and American Experimental Music. University of Chicago Press, 2008.
 Shipton, Alyn. A New History of Jazz. London: Continuum, 2001.

Films
 1982 - Great Black Music - The Art Ensemble of Chicago  Television documentary broadcast by Channel 4 in November 1982.
 1982 - Live From the Jazz Showcase: The Art Ensemble of Chicago (directed by William J Mahin, the University of Illinois at Chicago). Filmed at Joe Segal's Jazz Showcase in Chicago, November 1, 1981.

References

External links
  – official website, but not updated since before 2004, retrieved May 21, 2019
 The Art Ensemble of Chicago - current webpage as of 2019, maintained by Art Ensemble's European booking agency, retrieved May 21, 2019
 Art Ensemble of Chicago - Discography at Discogs
 Art Ensemble of Chicago discography (archive), retrieved January 11, 2005
 Art Ensemble of Chicago biography on the AACM site, retrieved January 11, 2005
 Art Ensemble of Chicago return to Mandel Hall after 32 years – report by Seth Sanders in the University of Chicago Chronicle, April 29, 2004, retrieved January 11, 2005
 Joseph Jarman interview at Furious, retrieved January 11, 2005
 Art Ensemble of Chicago photos, live in Salzburg/Austria 2006
 Art Ensemble of Chicago portraits by Dominik Huber at dominikphoto.com

American jazz ensembles from Illinois
Avant-garde jazz ensembles
Free jazz ensembles
Musical groups from Chicago
.
Pi Recordings artists
BYG Actuel artists
Nessa Records artists
Delmark Records artists
ECM Records artists
Musical groups established in 1966
1966 establishments in Illinois
Leo Records artists